Langeri is a village in Shaheed Bhagat Singh Nagar district of Punjab State, India. The village is administrated by Sarpanch an elected representative of the village.

Demography 
As of 2011, Langeri has a total number of 331 houses and population of 1526 of which 793 include are males while 733 are females according to the report published by Census India in 2011. The literacy rate of Langeri is 77.44%, higher than the state average of 75.84%. The population of children under the age of 6 years is 161 which is 10.55% of total population of Langeri, and child sex ratio is approximately 917 as compared to Punjab state average of 846.

Most of the people are from Schedule Caste which constitutes 69.53% of total population in Langeri. The town does not have any Schedule Tribe population so far.

As per the report published by Census India in 2011, 458 people were engaged in work activities out of the total population of Langeri which includes 422 males and 36 females. According to census survey report 2011, 41.70% workers describe their work as main work and 58.30% workers are involved in Marginal activity providing livelihood for less than 6 months.

Education 
The village has a Punjabi medium, co-ed upper primary school founded in 1944. The schools provide mid-day meal as per Indian Midday Meal Scheme. As per Right of Children to Free and Compulsory Education Act the school provide free education to children between the ages of 6 and 14. Amardeep Singh Shergill Memorial college Mukandpur and Sikh National College Banga are the nearest colleges.

Transport 

See also 
List of villages in India

References

External links 
 Tourism of Punjab
 Census of Punjab
 Locality Based PINCode

Villages in Shaheed Bhagat Singh Nagar district